The Party of Liberty and Social Justice is a liberal and nationalist political party in Morocco.

In the parliamentary election, held on 7 September 2007, the party did not win any seats.

Liberal parties in Morocco
Nationalist parties in Africa
Political parties in Morocco